General elections were held in Puerto Rico in 1928. Since they were held under the colonial rule of the United States, only municipalities were able to democratically elect their representation.

General elections in Puerto Rico
1928 in Puerto Rico
1928 elections in the Caribbean